Ismaila Atte-Oudeyi (born 2 February 1985, in Lomé) is a Togolese footballer, who currently plays for Togo Telecom F.C.

Career 
He began his career at AS Douane, played here between 2005 than joined to Maranatha F.C.

International career 
Atte-Oudeyi holds two games for Togo his first was on 11 October 2003 against Equatorial Guinea and his second and last game against Mali in Bamako on 27 March 2005.

Personal life
He is the younger brother of Zanzan Atte-Oudeyi.

References

External links 
 
 

1985 births
Living people
Togolese footballers
AS Douanes (Togo) players
Togo international footballers
Maranatha FC players
Association football midfielders
CO Modèle de Lomé players
21st-century Togolese people